Geron may refer to :

 Places and jurisdictions
 Girona, a city in Catalonia
 Curiate Italian name of Hieron, Caria (Asian Turkey), as Latin Catholic titular see in
 Saint-Géron, a commune in France

 Other
 Saint Gereon of Köln
 Geron, an elder (from the Greek "γέρων") of an Orthodox monastery (starets in Russian)
 Geron Corporation, an American biotechnology company
 Geron (insect), a genus of Bombyliidae

See also 
 Gerona (disambiguation)